Lewis County High School is located in Hohenwald, Tennessee. The mascot of the school is the Panther. It's located in the Lewis County School district, and it is the only high school in Lewis County.

References

Public high schools in Tennessee